Kristen-Paige Madonia is an American writer and creative writing teacher, known for her 2012 debut novel Fingerprints of You.

Awards
Best Fiction at the Tennessee Williams/New Orleans Literary Festival (2010, won for Polaroid)
Honorable Mention at the Westchester Fiction Awards (2013, for Fingerprints of You)

Bibliography
Fingerprints of You (2012)
Invisible Fault Lines (2016)

Short fiction
Water on Fire (Published in Upstreet, Number 7)
Polaroid (Published in New Orleans Review, Volume 36, No. 2
Sandstorms (Published in Sycamore Review, Volume 21, No.1
In Transit (Published in Inkwell, Volume 20
Finding V (Published in South Dakota Review,Volume 44, No. 1
Cheap Red Meat (Published in Pearl, Volume 36
Metal and Glass (Published in American Fiction: Best Previously Unpublished Short Stories by Emerging Writers, Volume 11)

References

External links
 

Living people
Novelists from Virginia
American women short story writers
American short story writers
American women novelists
Year of birth missing (living people)
James Madison University alumni
California State University, Long Beach alumni
21st-century American women